International Business Park (Abbreviation: IBP; ; Chinese: 国际商业园) is a high-tech business park managed by JTC Corporation in Jurong East, Singapore.

Background
Established in February 1992, the International Business Park is Singapore's first business park.

See also
Changi Business Park

External links
International Business Park at JTC Corporation

References

1992 establishments in Singapore
Business parks of Singapore
Jurong East